Escobar Partido is a partido in the northern part of the Gran Buenos Aires urban area, in Buenos Aires Province, Argentina.

Escobar is home to an significant population of Japanese Argentines.

Settlements

Belén de Escobar
Garín
Ingeniero Maschwitz 
Matheu 
Savio 
24 de Febrero
Loma Verde
Paraná

External links

 
 City Site
 Provincial Site
 InfoBAN Escobar

 
Partidos of Buenos Aires Province